The Keith House, also known as Washington's Headquarters or Headquarters Farm, is a historic house in Upper Makefield Township, Bucks County in the U.S. state of Pennsylvania. It served as the headquarters for George Washington during the American Revolutionary War and was listed on the National Register of Historic Places in 1978.

History 
The  of land surrounding the Keith House was originally set aside by William Penn for use by his family, but sold it in 1697 to a group of investors after he found people already living on it. The house was likely constructed sometime around 1742, with the land being acquired through an auction by William Keith in 1761.

During the American Revolutionary War, the house was headquarters for General George Washington from December 14 to December 24, 1776. It was the location from which Washington planned the crossing of the Delaware River and subsequent Battle of Trenton. Legend has it that the Keith House's spring house was where double agent John Honeyman was imprisoned to inform Washington of the plans of the Hessian troops in Trenton.

The house was kept in Keith family for 133 years. After the death of John Slack Keith, the house was sold to John Paxon in 1893. The property was acquired and owned by Henry Bristol between 1933 and 1946. The house was then sold to James Rendall.

See also 
 National Register of Historic Places listings in Bucks County, Pennsylvania
List of Washington's Headquarters during the Revolutionary War

References

Sources

External links
 Graeme Park - Keith House Official Site

Houses completed in 1742
American Revolutionary War sites
Houses on the National Register of Historic Places in Pennsylvania
Houses in Bucks County, Pennsylvania
1742 establishments in Pennsylvania
National Register of Historic Places in Bucks County, Pennsylvania